USS LST-1008 was an  in the United States Navy during World War II. She was transferred to Republic of China and then taken over by People's Liberation Army and renamed Dabie Shan.

Construction and commissioning 
LST-1008 was laid down on 16 February 1944 at  Bethlehem Steel Company, Quincy, Massachusetts. Launched on 23 March 1944 and commissioned on 18 April 1944.

Construction and career 
During World War II, LST-1008 was assigned to the Europe-Africa-Middle East and later Asiatic-Pacific theater. While in Europe, she participated in the assault of Normandy. From 8 to 9 June was disembarked at Easy White Beach. After the Normandy landing, she was assigned to the Far East as Occupation and China service from 1945 to 1946. On 24 May 1945, USS LCT-614 was hoisted aboard LST-1008 in Norfolk Navy Yard and on 16 September 1945, LCT-614 was launched from LST-1008 in Jinsen, Korea as part of Flotilla 15, Group 115.

She was decommissioned on 4 May 1946 and stricken on 19 June 1946. US State Department then transferred her to the Chinese National Relief and Rehabilitation Administration and later China Merchants Steam Navigation Company, serving in merchant service under the name Wanling and Zhong 112. In 1950, the People's Liberation Army found her abandoned in Shanghai. She was recommissioned into People's Liberation Army Navy after repair.

She sat at the Chinese Navy Museum as a museum ship in Qingdao, China from 1999 to 2005. From 2005 to 2007, she was towed for dismantling.

LST-1008 earned one battle star for World War II service.

References

LST-542-class tank landing ships
1944 ships
Ships transferred from the United States Navy to the Republic of China Navy
World War II amphibious warfare vessels of the United States
Museum ships in China